Saint Vincent and the Grenadines maintains close ties to the US, Canada, and the United Kingdom, and cooperates with regional political and economic organizations such as the Organisation of Eastern Caribbean States (OECS) and CARICOM. St. Vincent and the Grenadines is a member of the United Nations, the Commonwealth of Nations, the Organization of American States, and the Association of Caribbean States (ACS). Saint Vincent is also the smallest nation ever to be on the United Nations Security Council.

In May 1997, Prime Minister Mitchell joined 14 other Caribbean leaders and U.S. President Bill Clinton during the first-ever U.S.-regional summit in Bridgetown, Barbados. The summit strengthened the basis for regional cooperation on justice and counternarcotics issues, finance and development, and trade.

Saint Vincent is a transshipment point for South American illicit drugs destined for the US and Europe.

Diplomatic relations 
List of countries which Saint Vincent and the Grenadines has diplomatic relations with:

  – unknown
  – unknown
  – unknown
  – unknown
  – unknown
  – unknown
  – unknown
  – unknown
  – unknown
  – unknown
  – unknown
  – unknown
  – 1979
  – 19 September 1979
  – 19 September 1979
  – 27 October 1979
  – 27 October 1979
  – 27 October 1979
  – 28 October 1979
  – 1980
  – 1980
  – 15 April 1980
  – 24 May 1980
  – 12 December 1980
  – January 1981
  – 17 March 1981
  – 3 April 1981
  – 8 April 1981
  – 15 August 1981
  – 21 September 1981
  – 29 October 1981
  – 1982
  – 30 October 1982
  – 5 November 1982
  – 19 September 1983
  – 4 October 1983
  – 13 June 1985
  – 19 September 1985
  – 26 September 1985
  – 31 January 1986
  – 5 May 1986
  – 12 July 1986
  – 9 December 1986
  – 10 August 1988
  – 22 June 1989
  – 1 August 1989
  – 2 August 1989
  – 7 September 1989
  – 10 October 1989
  – 17 April 1990
  – 31 July 1990
  – 29 October 1990
  – 28 June 1991
  – 2 April 1992
  – 4 May 1992
  – 26 May 1992
  – June 1992
  – 8 June 1993
  – 28 June 1993
  – 11 November 1993
  – 30 November 1993
  – 7 October 1994
  – 12 April 1995
  – 1 September 1995
  – 18 December 1995
  – 1996
  – 16 May 1996
  – 13 August 1997
  – 9 December 1998
  – 19 February 1999
  – 11 October 2000
  – 4 April 2002
  – 24 April 2002
  – 17 September 2002
  – 15 May 2003
  – 22 May 2003
  – 23 May 2003
  – 27 May 2003
  – 11 September 2003
  – 16 February 2004
  – 24 May 2004
  – 27 July 2004
  – 10 December 2004
  – 17 December 2004
  – 23 May 2005
  – 2 December 2005
  – 17 July 2006
  – 2 August 2006
  – 25 August 2006
  – 13 October 2006
  – 5 February 2007
  – 7 February 2007
  – 20 February 2007
  – 22 February 2007
  – 2 May 2007
  – 31 May 2007
  – 11 June 2007
  – 13 June 2007
  – 18 June 2007
  – 2 July 2007
  – 11 September 2007
  – 26 September 2007
  – 13 July 2008
  – 1 August 2008
  – 7 August 2008
  – 23 September 2008
  – 3 October 2008
  – 12 February 2009
  – 20 February 2009
  – 19 March 2009
  – 2 May 2009
  – 12 January 2010
  – 30 May 2010
  – 22 June 2010
  – 8 November 2010
  – 16 November 2010
  – 29 April 2011
  – 4 May 2011
  – 26 May 2011
  – 13 October 2011
  – 19 September 2012
  – 28 September 2012
  – 21 November 2012
  – 8 January 2013
  – 15 April 2013
  – 15 April 2013
  – 10 December 2013
  – 27 May 2015
  – 26 September 2016
  – 21 March 2017
  – 26 May 2017
  – 27 September 2017
  – 18 December 2017
  – 1 April 2019
  – 24 September 2019
  – 25 September 2019
  – 25 September 2019
  – 26 September 2019
  – 5 December 2019
  – 12 August 2020
  – 9 November 2021
  – 24 November 2021
  – 28 January 2022
  – 30 March 2022
  – 10 May 2022

Bilateral relations

See also
List of diplomatic missions in Saint Vincent and the Grenadines
List of diplomatic missions of Saint Vincent and the Grenadines

References